Pyramid is an album by American jazz group the Modern Jazz Quartet featuring performances recorded in 1959-60 and released on the Atlantic label.

Reception
The Allmusic review states "The MJQ had become a jazz institution by this time, but they never lost their creative edge, and their performances (even on the remakes) are quite stimulating, enthusiastic, and fresh".

Track listing
 "Vendome" (John Lewis) - 2:30 
 "Pyramid (Blues for Junior)" (Ray Brown) - 10:46 
 "It Don't Mean a Thing (If It Ain't Got That Swing)" (Duke Ellington, Irving Mills) - 5:02 
 "Django" (John Lewis) - 4:36
 "How High the Moon" (Nancy Hamilton, Morgan Lewis) - 6:15 
 "Romaine" (Jim Hall) - 7:28

Personnel
 Milt Jackson - vibraphone
 John Lewis - piano
 Percy Heath - bass
 Connie Kay - drums

References

Atlantic Records albums
Modern Jazz Quartet albums
1960 albums
Albums produced by Nesuhi Ertegun